Menameradiel is a former municipality in Friesland, Netherlands. On 1 January 2018 it merged with the municipalities of Franekeradeel, het Bildt and parts of Littenseradiel to form the new municipality Waadhoeke.

Population centres 
Population centres as of 1 January 2007:

 Beetgum (754)
 Beetgumermolen (944)
 Berlikum (2,492) 
 Blessum (92) 
 Boksum (449) 
 Deinum (1,071)
 Dronryp (3,427)
 Engelum (415)
 Kleaster-Anjum (50)
 Marssum (1,156) 
 Menaam (2,612)
 Schingen (108)
 Slappeterp (80) 
Wier (207).

Topography

Dutch Topographic map of the former municipality of Menaldumadeel, June 2015

References

External links 

 

Waadhoeke
Former municipalities of Friesland
Municipalities of the Netherlands disestablished in 2018